Hiro Yamamoto (born April 13, 1961) is an American bassist who was a founding member of grunge band Soundgarden, along with Kim Thayil and Chris Cornell in 1984. He left the band in 1989, and two years later, he started the independent rock band Truly together with Screaming Trees drummer Mark Pickerel and Robert Roth from The Storybook Krooks. In 2016, Yamamoto co-founded the surf trio Stereo Donkey.

Soundgarden
Hiro Yamamoto (Yamamoto Hiro) was the founding bassist of Soundgarden. He performed with Cornell, Thayil, and drummer Scott Sundquist on the Deep Six compilation, and  performed with Cornell, Thayil, and drummer Matt Cameron on the EPs Screaming Life, Fopp, and Loudest Love, as well as on the albums Ultramega OK and Louder Than Love. He departed the band following the spring 1989 European tour. Jason Everman (formerly of Nirvana) replaced him on the bass briefly, after which Ben Shepherd became the permanent bassist. After Yamamoto  departed, he completed the requirements for his master's degree in physical chemistry at Western Washington University. He is currently the Chief of Organic Chemistry at Edge Analytical in Burlington, Washington. 

As did Cornell, Thayil, Cameron, and Shepherd, Yamamoto actively wrote songs for the band:
 "Heretic" (first version on Deep Six, second on Loudest Love) ... lyrics
 "Tears to Forget" (first version on Deep Six, second on Screaming Life)  music (co-written)
 "All Your Lies" (first version on Deep Six, second on Ultramega OK)  music (co-written)
 "Kingdom of Come" (Fopp)  credited to Soundgarden
 "665" (Ultramega OK)  music
 "667" (Ultramega OK)  music
 "Circle of Power" (Ultramega OK)  lyrics, vocals
 "Nazi Driver" (Ultramega OK)  music
 "Toy Box" (Flower) lyrics, music (co-written)
 "Power Trip" (Louder Than Love)  music
 "I Awake" (Louder Than Love) ... music
 "No Wrong No Right" (Louder Than Love) ... music

Truly
In 1991, Yamamoto formed a three-piece indie band, Truly; the other members were former Screaming Trees drummer Mark Pickerel and singer Robert Roth. Truly released two studio albums and a compilation of unreleased material before breaking up in 2000. The band reunited in 2008.

Stereo Donkey 

Following a successful 2016 jam session, Yamamoto formed a surf-inspired trio, Stereo Donkey, with drummer Mike Bajuk, and guitarist Pat Wickline. Unlike most surf music, which tends to feature either the guitar or the drums, Stereo Donkey emphasizes all three instruments- with Yamamoto's bass providing a fresh, melodic sound.

In November 2018, the band released an eponymous six-track EP, recorded in the old church that Wickline lives in. According to Wickline, “'The room is a fourth member of the band.'” The recording reportedly works as both surf music and exotica, yet is still rooted in, "Pacific Northwest rock history."

Other Performance 
On November 8, 2021, Yamamoto performed with other noted musicians at an event in Seattle honoring the Asian Hall of Fame's 2021 inductees, and the 35th anniversary of the Robert Chinn Foundation. The other performers included Jeff Kashiwa, Krist Novoselic, Ed Roth, and Danny Seraphine.

Discography
Soundgarden
 Screaming Life (EP)
 Fopp (EP)
 Ultramega OK
 Flower (single)
 Louder Than Love
 Loudest Love (EP)

Truly
 Heart and Lungs (EP) – 1991
 Fast Stories... from Kid Coma – 1995
 Feeling You Up – 1997
 Subject to Change: Artists for a Hate-Free America – 1997 compilation
 Twilight Curtains – 2000

Stereo Donkey
Stereo Donkey (EP) – 2018

References

External links 

 Official Stereo Donkey website

1961 births
American rock bass guitarists
American male bass guitarists
Grunge musicians
American musicians of Japanese descent
Living people
Musicians from Seattle
Soundgarden members
Truly members
Japanese-American instrumentalists
Western Washington University alumni
American alternative rock musicians
Alternative rock bass guitarists
Alternative metal bass guitarists
American male guitarists
20th-century American guitarists
Surf music
Exotica